The IFMAR World Championship for 1:10th Electric Off-Road Cars (officially "IFMAR 1:10 Electric Off-Road World Championship") is a world championship radio controlled car race sanctioned by the International Federation of Model Auto Racing (IFMAR). It takes place biennially on odd years since 1987 in its current format but inaugurated in 1985 as a championship for Stock (stock handout motor) and Modified class (modified motors and seven cells) It is considered by the radio-controlled modelling industry to be the most prestigious event in the calendar that a number of mainstream hobby and toy brands have fielded factory entries.

The event is open exclusively to 1:10 scale electric off-road buggies with those of 2WD and 4WD drivetrain, competing separately. These are characterized by its large wheels designed for off-road driving and enclosed single-seater bodyshell with large rear spoiler.

Despite taking place under the same host and venue, the two championships are regarded as separate events, therefore in between them, the circuit is required to be rebuilt and reconfigured differently.

All the world championships took place on dirt or clay tracks until 2015 when the decision was made to run controversially on artificial turf.

In the 2WD class Associated Electrics, holds distinction for the most wins for manufacturers with a total of 11; Masami Hirosaka of Japan, hold the record with three wins. In the 4WD class Yokomo holds distinction for the most wins for manufacturers; Hirosaka, holding the record with three wins.

Venues

IFMAR World Championship Winners

Stock

Unlimited
Split into two classes in 1987

2WD

4WD

Significance to the other Worlds events

As it is considered by the industry to be the most prestigious event in radio-controlled modelling, in an attempt to "generate sale revenue from their products”, it has attracted some of the biggest brands from the hobby and toy industries that included Nikko, Tomy, Tamiya and Traxxas. Only the latter two had greater success at the A-mains with Tamiya achieving 2nd by Lee Martin in 2013 and Scott Montgomery's 8th for Traxxas in 1991, both in 2WD.

At the 1989 Worlds, it was claimed by Radio Control Car Action that virtually every manufacturers, who had a 1:10 buggy on the market, was represented. In a bid to defend their 4WD title the same year; Schumacher, a title sponsor, handed out their latest car, the Top Cat, to any contender who was interested in representing them.

As a number of manufacturers spend a large sums of money to prepare their teams to ensure a win, as a result a number of those enforce secrecy to protect their prototypes from view. In one notable example, Team Associated, who was the only brand to field a prototype, refused to allow it to be photographed, covering their RC10 up with a towel on anybody who tried to and when forced an Australian team member to hand his film over as he managed to take a few shot of its exposed chassis during technical inspection. Losi in comparison managed to escape scrutiny as experimental two-speed transmission was kept secret and gave misleading answers to prying eyes. They switched to their conventional transmissions in the finals. By the time of the 1991 Worlds, this practice was enforced by a majority of manufacturers. This was in contrast to the 1986 IFMAR 1:8 IC Off-Road World Championship, when Japanese entrants from Kyosho clearly knew their outdated cars had little chance against their European competitors, freely took numerous photographs of their competitor's cars to benefit their research. The outcome became the Burns in late-1987 and then, at the turn of the decade came the highly successful Inferno series that dominated racing from then on.

To prepare for the 1989 event, Yokomo technicians famously collected soil sample on the track for analysis back in Japan. They were allegedly spotted by locals wheeling around the circuit, a cart that had a video camera mounted on it to get a car's eye view of the track. The result was a duplicate of the track that became the Yatabe Arena back home. Nowadays, regulation require the circuit to be altered at over 60% of its layout, had it been used prior to commencement date and closed for a 2-day minimum, 3-day maximum prior to then.

Good preparation is key to winning as opposed to accessibility to prototype arts as Associated learned in 1993; when they felt their standard issue, aluminium chassis RC10 was best suited to the circuit, mechanics proceeded to modify Brian Kinwald's chassis by rounding its square edges. Its suspension arms was molded from a more rigid graphite.

Teams and drivers are prepared to bend rules in an attempt to win. In 1989, Yokomo's TR-31 tires, only made available to Yokomo and Associated drivers, became a subject of scrutiny due to its size, given the speed its Yokomos and Associated were going.

The tires, were  inches tall (equivalent to 22 inch in full scale) which was illegal under ROAR regulation (maximum 2 inches) though IFMAR did not have such restrictions and was shipped in 30 boxes of tires from Japan. In comparison, Associated was quick to point out to the critics that at the 1987 Worlds, Kyosho fielded tires on its Ultima that was too wide for ROAR regulations.

Team Losi in retaliation, countered this by taking all the stops in the States to produce and ship over 100 pairs of oversize front tires, 200 pairs of rears and five sets of hand-machined aluminum wheels across the Pacific. The tires, only permitted on its JR-X2, ended with mixed results for drivers as the rim ended up being bent out of shape and discarded for Losi's standard wheel.

Some who attempted to bend the rules were not lucky such as at the 1993 Worlds; the electric motor of Ben Sturnham's Schumacher CAT 2000 was found with a hybrid motor illegal under IFMAR regulation regardless if it was compliant with the host country BRCA's regulations, his Tanaplan motor consisted of parts by other manufacturer of approved motors including Epic can and armature with Yokomo endbell. Sturnham had his 3rd-place finish demoted to a 10th place after all his lap times was removed despite protests by Tanaplan's Martin Finnesey that it offered no performance enhancement.

Schedule
A maximum of 150 drivers take part, each continental blocs allocated 32 entries each, the host bloc an extra 10 and the final 10 allocated by IFMAR themselves; should any allocation be left unused, it would be reallocated to the remaining blocs. The event takes place over eight days in total with the first reserved for competitor's registration followed by its opening ceremony in the afternoon then the two sets of three days for competitions.

The competitions begin with a minimum of six practice rounds over groups of fifteen consisting of ten drivers each, starting with the less experienced, this determines the number of heats required and the minimum time needed between rounds. Each heat consists of drivers who are ranked in order of priority; final ranking in the previous Worlds, then those of each countries and the domestic entrants and additional entries. In this case, in the 2015 Worlds, debutants Spencer Rivkin and Bruno Coehlo started at the lower-to-mid practice group 6 and 11 respectively, whereas Steven Hartson, Jared Tebo, Naoto Matsukura and Lee Martin start together in group 15 as the former two are defending champions and the latter given their performance or seeding in their home blocs whereas Travis Amezcua and David Ronnefalk, despite appearing at the A-main once previously, starts in practice group 14. Usually the final rounds are used as controlled practice. At the 2015 Worlds, practice rounds consisted of four rounds of open practice and two rounds of seeding practice to group the drivers together by skill level. The second day of competition, following the second controlled practice, consists of four rounds of qualifying heats and for day three; the final qualifying session and race day. For each qualifying session, a group of up to ten cars start under the "staggered start" system (a driver each starting separately within of one second of being called).

After each 5 minute qualifying session, the best qualifier of the round is awarded zero points, 2 and 3 points for the 2nd and 3rd fastest qualifier and so on with the most points given to the slowest qualifier. Of five rounds in total, the best three overall performances (as opposed to lap times in full-sized motorsport) counts toward the driver's overall performance, two best rounds count toward three or four rounds completed and one round count toward two or one rounds. After all the points are totaled up, the driver with the fewest points is the best qualifier, thus is awarded a TQ (Top Qualifier) spot, enabling them to start in front of each round. Should they tie in points with another driver, the one with the lowest points score of the three is used to break the tie, if this fails, then the next set of points will be used until the tie is broken. If the points fail to break the tie, then the driver's laps and time from the lowest score will be used.

The groups are then split into ten groups of ten drivers in alphabets, pending on their performance in qualifying with A being the fastest of the groups Race day starts with the slowest groups first, working its way to the next faster groups up to the fastest, the A-main, then progresses to the 2nd heat. Each race runs for a total of five minutes with extra time to allow the driver to complete their laps. Only the A-main, the group that carries the only hope of taking the world championship title, has three heats with only two best performances that counts and a final practice in the afternoon during race day and the rest run under a single 5 minute heat.

Following the conclusion of the first championship, the event will have an off day as the circuit would have to be rebuilt and reconfigured to a different layout required by IFMAR regulations as accordingly the two Worlds are considered to be a separate events. The practice would instead start with drivers who are ranked according to their performance in 2WD the day before.

Statistics

Most Wins

Drivers

2WD

4WD

Car manufacturers

2WD

4WD

Motors

2WD

4WD

ESC

2WD

4WD

Transmitters

2WD

4WD

By Member Blocs (Drivers)

2WD

4WD

Win(s) by Nations (Drivers)

2WD

4WD

Most represented in final
Note: Italics on year represents in which a driver of the country or car manufacturer who failed to score a championship title, italics on nationalities indicate host nation.

Nations (drivers)

2WD

4WD

Car manufacturers

2WD

4WD

Notes

References

Bibliography

 |ref=
<!—  -->
<!—  -->

 
Recurring sporting events established in 1985
Biennial sporting events
1985 establishments in California